Bunardžik is a village in the Ilinden Municipality of North Macedonia.

Demographics
As of the 2021 census, Bunardžik had 411 residents with the following ethnic composition:
Macedonians 351
Persons for whom data are taken from administrative sources 42
Serbs 10
Others 8

According to the 2002 census, the village had a total of 352 inhabitants. Ethnic groups in the village include:
Macedonians 349
Serbs 2
Others 1

References

Villages in Ilinden Municipality